Saint-Jean-Delnous (Languedocien: Sant Joan del Nos) is a commune in the Aveyron department in southern France.

Geography
The river Cérou has its source in the commune.

Population

See also
Communes of the Aveyron department

References

Communes of Aveyron
Aveyron communes articles needing translation from French Wikipedia